The 2019–20 season was the 140th season of competitive football by Rangers. It was their fourth consecutive season back in the top tier of Scottish football, having been promoted from the Scottish Championship at the end of the 2015–16 season. Rangers also competed in the Europa League and both domestic cups (League Cup and Scottish Cup).

On 13 March 2020, the Scottish football season was suspended with immediate effect due to the COVID-19 Coronavirus outbreak.

The Premiership was curtailed on 18 May 2020, with average points per game used to determine final league positions.

Rangers completed their UEFA Europa League campaign in August 2020.

Results and fixtures

Pre-season and friendlies

Scottish Premiership

Scottish League Cup

Scottish Cup

Europa League

Rangers qualified for the first qualifying round after finishing in second place in the 2018–19 Scottish Premiership.

Qualification stage

Group stage

Knockout stage

Squad statistics
The table below includes all players registered with the SPFL as part of the Rangers squad for 2019–20 season. They may not have made an appearance.

Appearances, goals and discipline
{| class="wikitable sortable" style="text-align:center"
|-
!rowspan="2" style="background:#00f; color:white;" |No.
!rowspan="2" style="background:#00f; color:white;" |Pos.
!rowspan="2" style="background:#00f; color:white;" |Nat.
!rowspan="2" style="background:#00f; color:white;" |Name
!colspan="2" style="background:#00f; color:white;" |Totals
!colspan="2" style="background:#00f; color:white;" |Scottish Premiership
!colspan="2" style="background:#00f; color:white;" |Scottish Cup
!colspan="2" style="background:#00f; color:white;" |League Cup
!colspan="2" style="background:#00f; color:white;" |Europa League
!colspan="2" style="background:#00f; color:white;" |Discipline
|-
!Apps
!Goals
!Apps
!Goals
!Apps
!Goals
!Apps
!Goals
!Apps
!Goals
!
!
|-
! colspan=16 style=background:#dcdcdc; text-align:center| Goalkeepers
|-
||3||0
||0||0
||0||0
|-
! colspan=16 style=background:#dcdcdc; text-align:center| Defenders
|-
||6||0
||1||0
||4||0
||7||0
||4||0
||4||0
||1||0
||7||0
||1||0
|-
! colspan=16 style=background:#dcdcdc; text-align:center| Midfielders
|-
||1||0
||8||1
||1||0
||2||0
||3||0
||1||0
||5||0
||9||0
||1||0
||1||1
||6||0
||0||0
|-
! colspan=16 style=background:#dcdcdc; text-align:center| Forwards
|-
||3||0
||10||2
||1||0
||1||0
||0||0
||0||0
|-
! colspan=16 style=background:#dcdcdc; text-align:center| Players transferred or loaned out during the season who made an appearance
||0||0
||0||0
||0||0
 Appearances (starts and substitute appearances) and goals include those in Scottish Premiership, League Cup, Scottish Cup, and the UEFA Europa League.

Club statistics

Competition Overview

League table

Results by round

Transfers

Players in

Players out

Loans in

Loans out

See also
List of Rangers F.C. seasons

Notes

References 

Rangers F.C. seasons
Rangers
Rangers